This is a list of Estonian football transfers in the winter transfer window 2019–20 by club.

This transfer window is open between the 2019 Meistriliiga and the 2020 Meistriliiga season. 1 club has changed: Tallinna JK Legion joins Estonian top division, Maardu Linnameeskond was relegated.

Meistriliiga

Flora Tallinn

In:

Out:

FCI Levadia

In:

Out:

Nõmme Kalju

In:

Out:

Paide Linnameeskond

In:

Out:

Tartu Tammeka

In:

Out:

Narva Trans

In:

Out:

Viljandi Tulevik

In:

Out:

JK Tallinna Kalev

In:

Out:

Kuressaare

In:

Out:

Tallinna JK Legion

In:

Out:

Esiliiga

FC Nõmme United

In:

Out:

Vändra JK Vaprus

In:

Out:

Pärnu Jalgpalliklubi

In:

Out:

References

External links
 Official site of the Estonian Football Association
 Official site of the Meistriliiga

Estonian
transfers
transfers
2019–20